The 1945 Miami Hurricanes football team represented the University of Miami as an independent during the 1945 college football season. The Hurricanes played their home games at Burdine Stadium in Miami, Florida, United States. The team was coached by Jack Harding, in his seventh year as head coach for the Hurricanes. The Hurricanes participated in the Orange Bowl in a post-season matchup against Holy Cross. The Hurricanes won 13 to 6.

Schedule

References

Miami
Miami Hurricanes football seasons
Orange Bowl champion seasons
Miami Hurricanes football